is a Japanese visual novel series produced by Mages, with character design and art provided by Karu. The series follows Mei Ayazuki, a high school girl who is sent back in time to the Meiji period and explores her relationships with spirits and Japanese historical figures.

Meiji Tokyo Renka was released as a mobile game by Dwango in 2011, with over 300,000 users playing the game. In 2013, it was ported onto the PlayStation Portable by Broccoli, and was then followed by game sequels and updated re-releases.

The original game franchise also expanded with a series of adaptations, including two theatrical animated films, musical theatre adaptations, an animated television series, and a live-action film.

Plot
On the night of the crimson moon, high school student Mei Ayazuki comes across a traveling magician, Charlie, and is transported back in time to the Meiji period, where she meets several historical figures and is invited to live with them. Though Mei has lost her memories, she begins helping the men with their own concerns through her ability to see and interact with spirits. While waiting for the next full moon, Mei comes to consider staying in the Meiji period altogether.

Characters

Portrayed by: Shion Aoki (Oborozuki no Chat Noir musical), Momoko Suzuki (Gekkō no Meine Liebe musical), Rikka Ihara (live-action film)
Mei is a high school student who is transported into the Meiji period and loses her memories. She has the ability to see spirits. Her name can be changed by the player in the games.

Portrayed by: Hirofumi Araki (musical), Shuto Miyazaki (live-action film)
Ogai is a translator and writer who also works as a doctor for the military. After meeting Mei, he has her to pretend to be his fiancé to avoid suspicion. Later on, he asks her to pose as his fiancée and invites her to live in his house. Throughout his route, Ogai faces a spirit named Elise, a character he created based on a girl he admired while he was in Germany.

 
Portrayed by: Shohei Hashimoto (musical), Makaha Takahashi (live-action film)
Shunso is an artist living with Ogai and is known for his unique art style. He acts exasperated towards Ogai and Mei, but secretly admires them. He is fascinated with cats, but falls into a slump after a black cat from one of his paintings escapes into the real world. Shunso also has problems with his vision and avoids getting examined out of fear that it may lead to the end of his career.

Portrayed by: Kousuke Asuma (musical), Taiki Yamazaki (live-action film)
Otojirō is an actor who works as a cross-dressing geisha under the name Otoyakko. He invites Mei to train as a geisha at his okiya. He enjoys the plays that Kyōka writes and uses them for his performances.

Portrayed by: Tomoru Akazawa (musical), Toman (live-action film)
Kyōka is a playwright. He is mysophobic and hates dogs. Like Mei, he can also see spirits, including the rabbit on his shoulder, a memento from his deceased mother.

 Portrayed by: Yu Yoshioka (musical), Yuki Kubota (live-action film)
Gorō is a policeman and a former member of the Shinsengumi. The reflection of his katana allows him to see spirits, which he fights to preserve peace in the village.

Portrayed by: Ire Shiozaki (musical), Tetsuya Iwanaga (live-action film)
Yakumo is a researcher from Greece who came to Japan to teach English and do research on Japanese spirits.

Portrayed by: Yūya Asato (musical), Yutaka Kobayashi (live-action film)
Charlie is a traveling magician who transports Mei into the Meiji period. He can only appear at nighttime.

 
Portrayed by: Shōta Matsushima (live-action film)
Tōsuke was introduced as an original character for the 2015 anime film Gekijōban Meiji Tokyo Renka: Yumihari no Serenade, but was integrated into the main cast following the release of Full Moon. He is an inventor with a focus on electric devices and can also see spirits. Because he believes a spirit killed his mother when he was young, he hopes to eliminate all spirits from the world.

Kōyō is an author and Kyōka's mentor. He was introduced as a new character for Haikara Date.

Rentaro is a prodigy pianist. He was introduced as a new character for Haikara Date.

Taikan is an apprentice painter and Shunso's friend. He was introduced as a new character for Haikara Date.

Media

Games

Meiji Tokyo Renka was originally a game published for mobile phones in 2011 by Dwango. The characters were designed by Karu. The game's theme song was "Tokyo Roman Tan" by KENN. The game was ported to the PlayStation Portable by Broccoli, which released on September 26, 2013. The game's theme song is "Kurenai no Yoru no Uta" by KENN. A sequel, Meiji Tokyo Renka: Twilight Kiss, was released for the PlayStation Portable on April 23, 2015.

An updated re-release of the first game, titled Meiji Tokyo Renka: Full Moon, was released for the PlayStation Vita on August 25, 2016, which included a route for Tōsuke Iwasaki, an original character from Gekijōban Meiji Tokyo Renka: Yumihari no Serenade and Gekijōban Meiji Tokyo Renka: Hana Kagami no Fantasia. A mobile port for the iOS and Android were released on July 20, 2017.

A fourth game developed by Mages and titled Meiji Tokyo Renka: Haikara Date was released as a mobile game app on December 14, 2018.

Light novels
Meiji Tokyo Renka was adapted into several light novels written by Yukiko Uozumi.

Manga
Meiji Tokyo Renka was adapted into a manga series by Hiyori Hinata and ran in Monthly Asuka. A manga anthology drawn by several artists was later released in 2016.

Film

An animated film project was announced in January 2013, and the cast from the original game reprised their roles. Sumire Morohoshi was cast as Mei, who was unvoiced in the games, and the film also introduced a new original character, Tōsuke Iwasaki. The film was animated by Studio Deen and directed by Hiroshi Watanabe.

The story is centered on Kyōka Izumi's route, with new plot elements introduced through Tōsuke Iwasaki. The first film, Gekijōban Meiji Tokyo Renka: Yumihari no Serenade, was released in theaters in Japan on July 18, 2015. The theme song, "Dance in the Light", was performed by KENN. The second part, Gekijōban Meiji Tokyo Renka: Hana Kagami no Fantasia was given a one-day screening event on May 6, 2016 in select theaters due to the first film's poor box office performance.

A live-action film titled Meiji Tokyo Renka was announced in January 2018 and is slated for a 2019 release. Rikka Ihara was cast as Mei. The film also stars Yutaka Kobayashi as Charlie, Shuto Miyazaki as Ogai, Makaha Takahashi as Shunso, Daiki Yamazaki as Otojirō, Toman as Kyōka, Yuki Kubota as Gorō, Tetsuya Iwanaga as Yakumo, and Shōta Matsushima as Tōsuke. To promote the film, a live-action television series featuring the same cast will air in April 2019. Daisuke Namikawa, Nobuhiko Okamoto, and Toshiyuki Morikawa, who voiced Ogai, Kyōka, and Charlie respectively, will make voice-only cameos in the film. The theme song, "Ichiya no Eien ni Kimi Omou", will be performed by KENN.

Musicals
A musical theatre adaptation titled Kageki Meiji Tokyo Renka: Oborozuki no Chat Noir ran in June 2016. Oborozuki no Chat Noir is centered on Shunso Hishida's route. The musical was directed by Kotaro Yoshitani and written by Sayaka Sakuragi. It starred Shohei Hashimoto as Shunso, Hirofumi Araki as Ogai, Kousuke Asuma as Otojirō, Tomoru Akazawa as Kyōka, Yu Yoshioka as Gorō, Ire Shiozaki as Yakumo, and Yūya Asato as Charlie. Shion Aoki was cast as Mei. The musical was given a home release on Blu-ray and region 2 DVD on October 5, 2016, with the Blu-ray peaking at #175 and the DVD at #109 on the Oricon Weekly Charts.

A sequel stage musical titled Kageki Meiji Tokyo Renka: Gekkō no Meine Liebe ran from August 18–19, 2018 at Morinomiya Piloti Hall in Osaka and August 25-September 2, 2018 at Theatre 1010 in Tokyo. The musical focuses on Ogai Mori's route. The cast from the previous musical reprised their roles, this time with Hirofumi Araki as lead, while Momoko Suzuki was recast in the role of Mei.

Anime
An anime adaptation was announced at a promotional event in October 2016. Akitaro Daichi was announced as the director at the Haikara Date promotional event on January 21, 2018. The cast from the games and the anime film reprised their roles and the show is animated by TMS Entertainment. The series premiered on Tokyo MX and TVA from January 9 to March 27, 2019. The series is being simulcasted by Crunchyroll, and in Indonesia by Ponimu. It is also being given an English dub by Funimation.

The opening theme song is "Tsukiakari no Rhapsodia" by KENN. The series features three ending songs, each performed by members of the cast: "Hoshikuzu no Yomibito" by KENN and Daisuke Namikawa; "Mellow na Yoru ni Odorimashō" by Shinnosuke Tachibana and Nobuhiko Okamoto; and "Yoiya Yoiya" by Kousuke Toriumi and Jun Fukuyama.

Episodes

Reception
Over 300,000 users had downloaded the 2011 mobile game. The PlayStation Portable port of the original game sold 5,963 copies in its first week.

References

External links
Official website
Official Full Moon website
 

2019 anime television series debuts
2.5D musicals
2013 video games
2015 video games
2016 video games
2018 video games
Anime television series based on video games
|AUS/NA
Funimation
Japan-exclusive video games
Kadokawa Beans Bunko
Light novels
Meiji period in fiction
Musicals based on anime and manga
Musicals based on video games
Otome games
PlayStation Portable games
PlayStation Vita games
Male harem anime and manga
Video games developed in Japan
Visual novels
Android (operating system) games
IOS games
Broccoli (company) games